The 2023 FIBA Basketball World Cup will be the 19th tournament of the FIBA Basketball World Cup for men's national basketball teams. The tournament will be the second to feature 32 teams. For the first time in its history, the World Cup will be hosted by multiple nations in Asia; the Philippines, Japan, and Indonesia, from 25 August to 10 September 2023.

It is the first World Cup to be hosted in Indonesia, and the second to be hosted in both the Philippines and Japan since they first hosted the tournament in 1978 and 2006, respectively. The tournament will also be the second straight to be held in Asia after China's hosting of the 2019 edition and the first time in tournament history that a host nation has not qualified.

The tournament will serve as qualification for the 2024 Summer Olympics, where the top two teams from each of the Americas and Europe, and the top team from each of Africa, Asia and Oceania, will qualify alongside the tournament's host France.

Spain will be the defending champions, having beaten Argentina in the 2019 final.

Host selection

On 7 June 2016, FIBA approved the bidding process for the 2023 FIBA Basketball World Cup. On 1 June 2017, FIBA confirmed the list of candidates for the hosting of the World Cup.

 Argentina / Uruguay
 Philippines / Japan / Indonesia
 Russia (withdrawn)
 Turkey (withdrawn)

Solo bidders Russia and Turkey ended their bids, leaving joint bids of Philippines–Japan–Indonesia and Argentina–Uruguay left in the race. On 9 December 2017, it was announced that the Philippines, Japan, and Indonesia won the bid against Argentina and Uruguay and will host the upcoming World Cup.

Preparations
2019

During the 2019 FIBA Basketball World Cup in China, the three host countries for the 2023 World Cup sent representatives to observe the tournament. Representatives from the Philippines, Japan, and Indonesia, as well as from the playing venues had a full-scale briefing from 10 to 15 September 2019 and observed the tournament's final phase. The delegations also observed the FIBA Congress and the Opening Ceremonies.

In May 2019, Representatives from the Philippines visited China to check and inspect on the venues to be used for the 2019 World Cup, to learn on how preparations are being done, that can be utilized for the 2023 edition. Among these venues were the Wukesong Arena in Beijing, the Foshan International Sports and Cultural Center in Foshan, and the Wuhan Gymnasium in Wuhan.

During a visit to Switzerland, FIBA Central board member Erick Thohir and Indonesian vice president Jusuf Kalla, along with other officials, met with FIBA Secretary-General Andreas Zagklis and other officials, to show Indonesia's readiness to host the World Cup, as well as the support provided by the Indonesian government. Prior to the meeting with FIBA, Vice President Kalla, Mr. Thohir, and other officials, visited the International Olympic Committee headquarters, and met with IOC President Thomas Bach, expressing their seriousness to host the 2032 Summer Olympics.

A turnover ceremony was held at halftime of the 2019 FIBA Basketball World Cup Final between Argentina and Spain at the Wukesong Arena in Beijing, to officially hand over the hosting rights of the FIBA Basketball World Cup from China to the Philippines, Japan, and Indonesia. FIBA Central Board members Manuel V. Pangilinan from the Philippines, Yuko Mitsuya from Japan, and Erick Thohir from Indonesia, received the FIBA Flag from Yao Ming, chairman of the Chinese Basketball Association. Also present at the turnover ceremony were then-FIBA President Horacio Muratore and FIBA Basketball World Cup 2019 Global Ambassador Kobe Bryant.

2020

During FIBA Executive Committee's meeting on 31 January 2020, International Olympic Committee and FIBA Executive Committee member Richard Carrión was appointed as the Chairman of the Joint Management Committee for the FIBA Basketball World Cup 2023. FIBA Oceania Executive Director David Crocker will also be the tournament's Executive Director.

Indonesian Youth and Sports Minister Zainudin Amali revealed plans for a new arena to be built in Jakarta for the tournament, with a capacity of between 15,000 and 20,000. According to Danny Kosasih, president of the Indonesian Basketball Association (PERBASI), President Joko Widodo has granted a permit for its construction. The arena will reportedly be similar to that of the Crypto.com Arena in Los Angeles.

The schedule of the 2023 FIBA Basketball World Cup was announced on 11 May 2020. The tournament will be held from 25 August to 10 September 2023.

On 25 August 2020, three years before the start of the tournament, Okinawa City officials conducted a symposium on the construction of an acceptable system for the World Cup. The local organizing committee for the city's hosting was also formed during the same event. In attendance were Okinawa City Mayor Sachio Kuwae, Okinawa Chamber of Commerce President Toshiyuki Miyazato, and Ryukyu Golden Kings President Tatsuro Kimura.

On 16 October 2020, during a visit to Switzerland, Indonesian Minister of State-Owned Enterprises and FIBA Central board member Erick Thohir visited the FIBA Headquarters in Mies, Switzerland to convey the progress of Indonesia's preparations for the World Cup, as well as the development of the country's national team. Thohir mentioned that the Istora Gelora Bung Karno was only approved for the 2021 FIBA Asia Cup (moved to 2022), which will be hosted by the country, but not for the World Cup. There are two options for the venue – to build a new arena or use an existing facility.

2021

The Okinawa Arena hosted a "pre-opening event" from April to May 2021, which consisted of home games of the Ryukyu Golden Kings. Full operations of the arena began in June 2021.

On 31 August 2021, the draw for the FIBA Basketball World Cup 2023 Qualifiers was held in Mies, Switzerland. In attendance were FIBA Secretary General Andreas Zagklis, Spanish Basketball Federation President Jorge Garbajosa, and 2006 and 2019 World Cup champion Rudy Fernández. Representatives from the Philippines attended the event virtually from Manila, which included FIBA Central Board member Manuel V. Pangilinan and 2020 Summer Olympics gold medalist Hidilyn Diaz.

According to Nirmala Dewi, Secretary-General of the Indonesian Basketball Association (PERBASI), the groundbreaking for the new arena to be built at the Gelora Bung Karno Sports Complex in Jakarta is planned for December 2021. The new venue, then known as the Gelora Bung Karno Indoor Multifunction Stadium (IMS), was originally scheduled to open by July 2023, based on initial assessments. Construction of the venue began in December 2021.

2022

On 1 March 2022, the first ticket package sales began. In May 2022, officials from FIBA and its various departments visited the Philippines and held week-long events alongside the Philippines' Local Organizing Committee. Among the events were the ocular inspections of the three venues to be used in the country for the World Cup, namely the Smart Araneta Coliseum in Quezon City, the Mall of Asia Arena in Pasay, and the Philippine Arena in Bocaue. A debriefing was also held in Pasay City to conclude the events, which tackled important facets regarding the country's readiness to host the tournament.

On 14 July 2022, FIBA Secretary-General Andreas Zagklis and other FIBA officials, during their visit to Indonesia for the 2022 FIBA Asia Cup, conducted an ocular inspection on the new Indonesia Arena at the Gelora Bung Karno Sports Complex in Jakarta, the venue to be used in the country's hosting of the World Cup. They were accompanied by select officials from the Indonesian Basketball Association. Additionally, the Indonesian Ministry of Public Works and Housing noted that the arena's progress as of the said month is at 32 percent, with a target opening date of December 2022.

From 25 to 28 August 2022, countdown clocks were unveiled in various locations in the three countries to mark one year before the World Cup, attended by various officials from FIBA and the local organizing committees. Additionally, the second phase of ticket sales also began with packages for the Final Phase being made available. During this span, Indonesian actor Raffi Ahmad and Miss Universe 2018 Catriona Gray were announced as local ambassadors for the tournament in Indonesia and the Philippines, respectively. Former Philippine national team members LA Tenorio, Jeff Chan, Larry Fonacier, and Gary David were also named local ambassadors.

The Japanese B.League was named a local ambassador for the tournament in Japan on 22 September 2022. A Volunteers Program for the Philippines was also launched by the country's Local Organizing Committee on 30 November 2022, opening applications for aspiring applicants to serve as volunteers during the World Cup.

On 14 December 2022, former Argentina national team player and two-time FIBA Basketball World Cup silver medalist Luis Scola was named a Global Ambassador for the tournament.

2023

Two-time NBA champion and 2006 World Cup winner Pau Gasol joined Scola as one of the tournament's Global Ambassadors on 6 February 2023. Gasol served as an Ambassador for the 2022 FIBA Women's Basketball World Cup in Australia months prior. Ten-time NBA All-Star and three-time Olympic Gold Medalist Carmelo Anthony was also named a Global Ambassador on 24 February 2023.

Japan launched its Volunteers Program on 27 February 2023.

Venues
Five venues from five host cities will host matches for the 2023 FIBA Basketball World Cup. Three cities in the Greater Manila Area will host four Preliminary Round Groups, two Second Round Groups, and the Final tournament phase from the Quarterfinals onwards. On the other hand, Okinawa and Jakarta will each be host to two Preliminary Round Groups and one Second Round Group. The Philippines will host 16 teams while Japan and Indonesia will host 8 teams each.

In the Philippines, there will be three venues that will be used for the World Cup: The Mall of Asia Arena in Pasay, Smart Araneta Coliseum in Quezon City, and the Philippine Arena in Bocaue, Bulacan. The Mall of Asia Arena hosted the 2013 FIBA Asia Championship, the 2016 FIBA World Olympic Qualifying Tournament in Manila, and the 5v5 basketball events of the 2019 Southeast Asian Games. The Smart Araneta Coliseum hosted the 1978 FIBA World Championship, while the Philippine Arena has a 55,000 seating capacity and is poised to host the tournament's final phase and the World Cup Final. The arena also hosted the 2018 FIBA 3x3 World Cup and the opening ceremony of the 2019 Southeast Asian Games. All three venues in the country hosted various 2019 and 2023 FIBA Basketball World Cup Asian Qualifiers games of the Philippines.

There will be one venue each in Japan and Indonesia. The Okinawa Arena in Okinawa has a 10,000 seating capacity and is the new home arena of the Ryukyu Golden Kings of the Japanese B.League. The arena also hosted exhibition games involving the Japanese men's basketball team in preparation for the 2020 Summer Olympics in Tokyo and various 2023 FIBA Basketball World Cup Asian Qualifiers games of Japan. Initially, the Istora Gelora Bung Karno in Jakarta was the venue to be used for the tournament. However, FIBA Central Board member Erick Thohir mentioned that the said venue was only approved for the 2021 FIBA Asia Cup (postponed to 2022) to be hosted by the city, but not for the World Cup. During the draw for the FIBA Basketball World Cup 2023 Qualifiers on 31 August 2021, it was revealed that a new venue located at the Gelora Bung Karno Sports Complex will be used for the tournament. Known as Indonesia Arena, it will have a seating capacity of 16,500 spectators.

Qualification

As co-hosts, the Philippines and Japan each got an automatic qualification for the tournament when they were awarded the joint hosting rights along with co-host Indonesia. However, Indonesia's host qualification slot was conditional as FIBA wanted the Indonesian national team to be competitive by 2021 and thus required Indonesia to qualify for and finish in the top-eight (advance to the quarter-finals) of the 2022 FIBA Asia Cup (postponed from 2021). Indonesia officially qualified for the Asia Cup as host and advanced from the preliminary round-robin round, but lost to China in the playoff round (round of 16) and were therefore unable to secure qualification for their hoped-for FIBA Basketball World Cup debut. This is the first time in the history of the FIBA Basketball World Cup that a host nation has not qualified.

80 teams from four FIBA zones qualified for the World Cup qualifiers through qualification for the FIBA Continental Cups (AfroBasket 2021, 2022 FIBA AmeriCup, 2022 FIBA Asia Cup, and EuroBasket 2022). For Europe and the Americas, additional teams qualified through the pre-qualifiers of the said regions. The participants of both the AfroBasket and the Asia Cup comprise the teams that will also take part in the qualifiers for their respective regions. The first game of the qualifiers took place in Minsk on 25 November 2021 between Belarus and Turkey, as part of the European Qualifiers. The draw for the World Cup qualifiers was held at the Patrick Baumann House of Basketball in Mies, Switzerland, on 31 August 2021.

The first round of the Americas, Asia/Oceania, and Africa qualifiers featured 16 teams each, whereas Europe will have 32 teams. Division A teams were split into groups of four, to be held in a home-and-away round-robin. The top three teams in each group advanced to the second round. In round two of the World Cup qualifiers, teams were split into six groups, totaling four groups in Europe and two in the other qualifiers. Teams carried over the points from round one, and faced the other three teams again in a home-and-away round-robin. The best teams in each group qualified for the World Cup. No wild card selection will be held, and the Olympic champions were not guaranteed a spot in the tournament.

The complete field of 32 teams that will participate in the FIBA Basketball World Cup 2023 was determined on 27 February 2023 at the conclusion of the sixth window of qualifiers.

Qualified teams

On 28 August 2022, Finland and the Ivory Coast became the first teams to qualify from Europe and Africa, respectively. The following day, New Zealand became the first Asian team outside of hosts Japan and the Philippines to qualify for the tournament. Finland will be making their second World Cup appearance after their debut at the 2014 edition in Spain. On 10 November 2022, Canada became the first team from the Americas to qualify.

Alongside Finland, Slovenia, Egypt, and Mexico will be returning to the World Cup since the 2014 edition after notably missing the 2019 tournament in China.

Lebanon will be returning to the World Cup after participating in the 2010 edition, while Latvia, South Sudan, and Georgia will all be making their FIBA Basketball World Cup debut. Cape Verde also qualified for their first World Cup, becoming the smallest nation in tournament history to qualify. 

Brazil and the United States also secured qualification for the tournament, continuing their streaks of participating in all World Cups since its inception in 1950.

Days before the second window of the Asian Qualifiers, South Korea withdrew from the tournament due to one of its players, scheduled to join the team in its second window campaign, testing positive for COVID-19. The Korea Basketball Association made an appeal to FIBA to justify its non-appearance in the qualifiers but was rejected. As a result, South Korea failed to qualify for the World Cup after qualifying for two straight tournaments (2014 and 2019). Russia, who also participated in the 2019 World Cup, were banned from FIBA tournaments, including the World Cup and its qualifiers due to the country's invasion of Ukraine in February 2022. Belarus was also banned from FIBA tournaments and the past results of the games they played in the European Qualifiers were annulled.

After winning the silver medal at the 2019 World Cup in China, Argentina failed to qualify for the tournament after nine consecutive appearances dating back to 1986.

Africa (5)
 
 
 
 
 

Americas (7)
 
 
 
 
 
 
 

Asia and Oceania (8)
 
 
 
  (host)
 
 
 
  (host)

Europe (12)

Squads
Each team will have a final roster of 12 players; a team can opt to have one naturalized player as per FIBA eligibility rules from its roster.

Draw
The draw will take place on 29 April 2023 at the Smart Araneta Coliseum in Quezon City, Philippines. Full details regarding the pot allocation have not been announced yet, although host Philippines and the highest ranked teams after the February 2023 qualifying window will be allocated to Pot 1. Furthermore the three host countries are given the privilege to select a team each to host in the group stage. The United States were selected to play in the Philippines, Slovenia in Japan, and Canada in Indonesia. FIBA cites "commercial reasons" for the selection which it says would not affect the draw process.

Format
Similar to the 2019 edition, the tournament will be played in three stages. In the first stage, the 32 qualified teams will be sorted into eight groups of four (A–H), each team in a group will play each other once. The top two teams from each group will then advance to the second group stage. In the second group stage there will be four groups (I–L) of four made up of the teams that advanced from the first round, again playing each other once. The top two teams from groups I to L will qualify for the final knockout phase.

Preliminary round

Group A 
Venue: Araneta Coliseum, Quezon City

Group B 
Venue: Araneta Coliseum, Quezon City

Group C 
Venue: SM Mall of Asia Arena, Pasay

Group D 
Venue: SM Mall of Asia Arena, Pasay

Group E 
Venue: Okinawa Arena, Okinawa City

Group F 
Venue: Okinawa Arena, Okinawa City

Group G 
Venue: Indonesia Arena, Jakarta

Group H 
Venue: Indonesia Arena, Jakarta

Second round

Group I 
Venue: Araneta Coliseum, Quezon City

Group J 
Venue: SM Mall of Asia Arena, Pasay

Group K 
Venue: Okinawa Arena, Okinawa City

Group L 
Venue: Indonesia Arena, Jakarta

17th–32nd Classification

Group M 
Venue: Araneta Coliseum, Quezon City

Group N 
Venue: SM Mall of Asia Arena, Pasay

Group O 
Venue: Okinawa Arena, Okinawa City

Group P 
Venue: Indonesia Arena, Jakarta

Final round

Venue: Philippine Arena, Bocaue, Bulacan

Marketing

Logos
The official logo for the FIBA Basketball World Cup 2023 was unveiled on 4 December 2020. The logo's concept consist of three main elements. The heart symbolizes the passion for the game, the Naismith Trophy represents the prize given to the winner of the World Cup, and the "23" represents the year of the World Cup. The logo for the 2023 FIBA Basketball World Cup has already been agreed upon as early as July 2019 and only needed to be approved by FIBA as of that time. The logo was designed by VMLY&R. On 28 November 2020, FIBA launched the Don't Miss A Beat campaign leading up to the logo launch. The launch was also the most impactful logo launch in FIBA's history.

There are also host city logos for Manila, Jakarta, and Okinawa. The Manila logo features a Jeepney, the most popular mean of transportation in the Philippines. Logos for Jakarta and Okinawa feature several landmarks – the Shuri Castle in Shuri, Okinawa and the Monas, the national monument of Indonesia, located in Jakarta.

Slogan
On 31 August 2021, during the qualifiers draw, FIBA released the slogan for the World Cup, "Win For All".

Mascot
On 9 June 2022, FIBA unveiled the official mascot for the FIBA Basketball World Cup 2023. According to its fictional biography, the mascot, initially unnamed, was created through the idea of three fans from the three host countries (Philippines, Japan, and Indonesia), to create "something amazing that could unite people and represent them all." The mascot is a basketball robot with an LED face which allows it to connect and interact with people through its various expressions. In addition, the mascot also has a basketball hoop attached to its back as an advocacy for the importance of recycling. The red, blue, and yellow colors of the mascot represent the three colors of the national flags of the host nations. An online naming competition was held, and on 28 July 2022, it was announced the mascot's name is "JIP," which is the first letter of each of the three host countries - the Philippines, Japan, and Indonesia.

Ticketing
The first variety of ticket package sales started on 1 March 2022. "Follow My Team" passes for the Philippines and Japan consist of all five Group Phase games of the two host countries. For Indonesia, a "Venue Pass" covers all 12 games of the same phase at the Indonesia Arena.

On 25 August 2022, the second variety of ticket package sales commenced one year before the tournament. Packages for the Final Phase at the Philippine Arena were released, as well as two-day passes for Group Phase and Second Round games to be held at the Okinawa Arena. Two packages are available for the Final Phase, namely the "Finals Ultimate Fan Pass", consisting of all final phase games, and the "Finals Superfan Pass" for games starting from the semifinals until the World Cup Final.

Single-game tickets and day passes are expected to be available in 2023.

Countdown clocks
Three countdown clocks were unveiled from 25 to 28 August 2022 to mark one year before the tournament. These clocks are situated at the Tenbusu Naha Plaza in Naha, Okinawa; the Selamat Datang Monument in Jakarta; and the SM Mall of Asia in Pasay.

Sponsorship

Broadcasting rights

See also

 2022 FIBA Women's Basketball World Cup

Notes

References

External links

 
2023
FIBA Basketball World Cup
World Cup
World Cup, 2023
World Cup, 2023
World Cup, 2023
2023 in Indonesian sport
2023 in Japanese sport
2023 in Philippine sport
Sports events affected by the 2022 Russian invasion of Ukraine